The Lemuel B. Chase House is a historic house located in Barnstable, Massachusetts. It is a well-preserved example of Greek Revival architecture.

Description and history 
The 1-3/4 story wood-frame house was built sometime in the 1820s, and is a well-preserved side-hall entry Greek Revival house with a -story wing. It has wide corner boards supporting a fascia with dentil moulding. The main entry is flanked by sidelight windows and pilasters supporting a full entablature; a side entrance in the wing is similarly styled except for the windows.

The house was listed on the National Register of Historic Places on March 13, 1987.

See also
National Register of Historic Places listings in Barnstable County, Massachusetts

References

Houses in Barnstable, Massachusetts
National Register of Historic Places in Barnstable, Massachusetts
Houses on the National Register of Historic Places in Barnstable County, Massachusetts
Greek Revival houses in Massachusetts